Francesco Ruggiero (16 August 1957 in Naples, Italy – 18 January 2007 in Geneva, Switzerland) was an Italian physicist. 
In 1985, he received his Ph.D. in accelerator physics from the Scuola Normale Superiore di Pisa.

He participated in the commissioning of Large Electron–Positron Collider, contributed to the Large Hadron Collider design, became the leader of the accelerator group in CERN and finally coordinated the CARE-HHH framework devoted to the LHC upgrade studies (or Super Large Hadron Collider). 

For a long period, he also was associate editor of the prestigious Physical Review Accelerators and Beams journal.

A memorial symposium dedicated to Ruggiero took place at CERN on 3 October 2007.

References

External links
His personal web page at CERN
CERN Bulletin article
An abstract of his career published on BEAM’07 Proceedings
Presentations made at 2007 CERN symposium, containing comprehensive summaries of Francesco's contributions to science
PDF presentation of LHC upgrade by Ruggiero 
Conference organized by Ruggiero
Scientific publications of Francesco Ruggiero on INSPIRE-HEP

1957 births
2007 deaths
People associated with CERN
20th-century Italian physicists
21st-century Italian physicists